Swansea Docks is the collective name for several docks in Swansea, Wales. The Swansea docks are located immediately south-east of Swansea city centre. In the mid-19th century, the port was exporting 60% of the world's copper from factories situated in the Tawe Valley. The working docks area today is owned and operated by Associated British Ports as the Port of Swansea and the northern part around the Prince of Wales Dock is undergoing re-development into a new urban area branded the SA1 Swansea Waterfront.

Docks 

Docks which have existed or still exist in the complex include:

North Dock 
The North Dock was created to fulfil the increasing shipping demands from the nearby metals industry. The North Dock was created by diverting the River Tawe by cutting a new direct course within a meander section near the estuary. The old course of the River became the new dock and work was completed in 1852. Secluded and poorly lit, the area around North Dock was popular with prostitutes and their clients, until lighting was improved following the drowning of Selina Rushbrook in the lock gate in 1907. The North Dock closed in 1930 after the development of new larger docks on the east side of the River Tawe made the North Dock obsolete. The north dock has since been filled in and the Parc Tawe retail complex was built on the site in the late 1980s.

South Dock 
Construction began on the South Dock in 1852 by a private company. It was built on a site west of the River Tawe, just south of the North Dock and was not completed until 1859. The South Dock was closed in 1971 and was redeveloped in the 1980s. The dock itself became the Swansea Marina and the land around the dock was developed as the Maritime Quarter residential area.

Prince of Wales Dock 

The Swansea Harbour Trust began constructing the Prince of Wales Dock in 1879 on Fabian's Bay to the east of the River Tawe. Usage of the Prince of Wales dock declined throughout the latter half of the 20th century. The Prince of Wales Dock is now being redeveloped as the Prince of Wales Marina with 500 berths. A new channel with sea lock and holding basin is currently under construction to link the Prince of Wales Dock directly with the River Tawe. A basic cable operated wakeboarding facility opened in the Prince of Wales Dock in 2010, but was short-lived. The Dock is also the site of the swim section of the yearly Swansea Triathlon.

King's Dock 
Work began on the King's Dock in 1905 to meet the growing demand of tinplate exports from the local area. The King's Dock was constructed as a much larger dock than the Prince of Wales on the south side of the Prince of Wales Dock and covers some 72 acres (29 ha). Construction was complete by 1909. The King's Dock is the principal dock in the Port of Swansea which is still in use today for cargo operations.

Queen's Dock 
At the same time as the King's Dock was being built, a breakwater was constructed further south of the King's Dock which enclosed a large body of water covering some 151 acres (61 ha). This body of water was opened in 1920 as the Queen's Dock after oil handling facilities were built to handle imports for the nearby BP oil refinery at Llandarcy and petrochemical plant at Baglan Bay. Usage of the Queen's Dock reached its peak in the 1950s when oil imports and exports reached around 8 million tonnes per year. Since the closure of the oil plants at Baglan Bay and Llandarcy, the Queen's Dock was rendered obsolete as an oil handling facility. The Queen's Dock is now used for mussel farming.

History 

Due to increases in industrial output and in trade in copper, zinc, iron and tinplate combined with the developments in shipping (big steamships were replacing smaller sailing vessels) by the late 19th century, Swansea's harbour was in desperate need of expansion. The Swansea Harbour Trust (SHT) commissioned the construction of the Prince of Wales Dock, the first on the east side of the river. Opened in 1881 by the Prince and Princess of Wales (later Edward VII and Queen Alexandra), it was completed in 1882 and expanded in 1898. The North Quay frontage was let to the Great Western Railway, the Neath and Brecon Railway and the Rhondda and Swansea Bay Railway, which linked the Dulais Valley and Rhondda Valley coalfields directly with the docks. In addition to shunting locomotives operated by the SHT, further engines were provided by Powlesland and Mason from 1903 onwards.

Port of Swansea 
The Port of Swansea is an Atlantic shipping port operated by Associated British Ports which comprises the King's Dock, Queen's Dock, two dry docks and a roll-on/roll-off ferry terminal in the River Tawe.

Port facilities 
It offers warehouses and facilities for handling dry bulks, minerals, ores, forest products and general cargo.

Ferry services 
There is a roll-on/roll-off ferry terminal in the western part of the docks. Between 1987 and 2006, a regular passenger and car ferry to Ringaskiddy in County Cork, Ireland departed from here. The ferry was operated by a company called Swansea Cork Ferries. The ferry service was suspended from 2007 A website and online campaign/e-petition was started in an attempt to highlight the effect that the loss of the Swansea Cork ferry was having on Swansea and the South-West of Ireland. In April 2009, a newly formed co-operative purchased a new vessel to provide a service between Swansea and County Cork. Sailings commenced on 10 March 2010 but ceased as untenable on 2 February 2011.

Nearest places 
 Maritime Quarter
 Swansea city centre
 St Thomas
 Port Tennant
 Crymlyn Burrows
 Jersey Marine beach
 Swansea Beach

References

External links 
 Port of Swansea
 SA1 Waterfront information about regeneration project
 SA1 Swansea Waterfront
 Technium Swansea
 Swansea Docks Retired Section (contains historical information and old photos about Swansea Docks)
 Campaign to bring back the Swansea Cork Ferry

Geography of Swansea
Districts of Swansea
Transport in Swansea
Buildings and structures in Swansea
Ports and harbours of Wales
Swansea Bay
Ports and harbours of the Bristol Channel
Redeveloped ports and waterfronts in Wales